Charles Perry Gorin (February 6, 1928 – February 21, 2021) was an American professional baseball player and left-handed pitcher who appeared in seven games—all in relief—in Major League Baseball during  and  with the Milwaukee Braves.

Gorin attended the University of Texas at Austin and was signed by the Boston Braves in 1950. His professional career was interrupted by service in the Korean War, which caused him to miss the 1952 and 1953 seasons. During his two major league auditions, Gorin compiled a 0–1 record with no saves, and allowed six hits, four earned runs and nine bases on balls in ten full innings pitched. He struck out 12 and compiled a 3.60 earned run average.

Gorin also played in the winter leagues, most notably in the Liga de Béisbol Profesional de Puerto Rico but also in Texas. His career in minor league baseball extended through the 1961 season.

External links

References

1928 births
2021 deaths
American military personnel of the Korean War
Atlanta Crackers players
Austin Senators players
Baseball players from Texas
Houston Buffs players
Major League Baseball pitchers
Milwaukee Braves players
Milwaukee Brewers (minor league) players
Mobile Bears players
Sacramento Solons players
Sportspeople from Waco, Texas
Texas Longhorns baseball players
Toledo Sox players
Wichita Braves players